Marjorie Spooner O'Neill is an Australian politician. O'Neill was elected as a Labor member of the New South Wales Legislative Assembly representing Coogee at the 2019 state election. O'Neill was also a Councillor of Waverley Council from 2017 to 2021.

Background and early life
Born to Brian William O'Neill and Keri Spooner, O'Neill was raised in the Bronte area of Sydney. Marjorie attended St Vincent's College, Potts Point. Her father, Brian O'Neill, served as a member of the Industrial Relations Commission of New South Wales for over 20 years. She has a PhD in Management and Economics and has been an academic teaching in Australia and internationally.

O'Neill is a volunteer surf lifesaver at Clovelly Surf Life Saving Club. She also played rugby union for Sydney University Women's Rugby Club and coached at UNSW.

Political career 
O'Neill was first elected to Waverley Council on 9 September 2017 in Waverley Ward representing the Labor Party. She serves as the Chair of the Community Safety Advisory Committee and the Waverley Surf Life Saving Club Committee. She was later preselected to run as the Labor candidate in the Division of Coogee in the 2019 state election. Dr. O'Neill defeated Bruce Notley-Smith to become the Member for Coogee, in one of two victories for the Labor Party in the 2019 State Election.

O'Neill used her inaugural speech to discuss her heritage, her family, the history of the electorate of Coogee, and her priorities while she holds the seat. She is a regular contributor to The Beast magazine.

Publications

References 

Australian Labor Party councillors
Waverley Council
Members of the New South Wales Legislative Assembly
Australian Labor Party members of the Parliament of New South Wales
Women members of the New South Wales Legislative Assembly
21st-century Australian politicians
21st-century Australian women politicians
Year of birth missing (living people)
Living people